Konstantinos "Kostas" Sloukas (Greek: Κωνσταντίνος "Κώστας" Σλούκας; born January 15, 1990) is a Greek professional basketball player for Olympiacos of the Greek Basket League and the Euroleague. He is also a regular member of the senior National Team of Greece. He is a left-handed, 1.87m (6'2 ") tall point guard, who can also play at the shooting guard position.

Sloukas has played in six EuroLeague Finals (2012, 2013, 2015, 2016, 2017, and 2018), winning the title on three occasions (2012, 2013, and 2017). He was a member of the All-EuroLeague First Team in 2019.

Early career
Sloukas began playing club basketball as a youth, with Megas Alexandros Thessaloniki. Then he moved to the Mandoulides School youth teams, in Thessaloniki, Greece.

Professional career

Olympiacos Piraeus
Sloukas joined the Greek Basket League power Olympiacos Piraeus, in the year 2008. He then spent the 2008–09 and 2009–10 seasons with the club. He made his debut in Greece's top-tier level Basket League, during the 2008–09 season, and made his debut in Europe's top-tier level, the EuroLeague, during the 2009–10 season. He also won the Greek Cup title with Olympiacos, in 2010.

Aris Thessaloniki loan
Sloukas was loaned by Olympiacos, to the Greek club Aris Thessaloniki, in 2010. While a member of Aris, he was named the Greek Basket League's Best Young Player of the Greek Basket League 2010–11 season. With Aris, he also played in Europe's second-tier level competition, the EuroCup, during the same season.

Back to Olympiacos Piraeus
After spending the 2010–11 season with Aris, on loan from Olympiacos, Sloukas returned to Olympiacos for the 2011–12 season. With Olympiacos, he went on to win both the 2012 Greek League championship, and the 2012 EuroLeague championship. He then signed a 3-year contract extension with Olympiacos, in June 2012.

With Olympiacos, Sloukas also won the 2013 EuroLeague championship, and the 2013 FIBA Intercontinental Cup championship. In his last season with Olympiacos, Sloukas was selected to the Greek League Best Five team, and he also played in the 2015 EuroLeague Finals.

Fenerbahçe İstanbul
On June 29, 2015, Sloukas signed a three-year contract (with the 3rd year being optional) with the Turkish Super League club Fenerbahçe İstanbul. With Fenerbahçe, he made it to the 2016 EuroLeague Finals, and then won the 2017 EuroLeague championship. In the summer of 2017, Sloukas signed a new 3-year contract with Fenerbahçe (with the 3rd year being optional), at a salary of €1.7 million euros net income per season.

Sloukas played in his third straight EuroLeague Finals with Fenerbahçe, as the club also made it to the 2018 EuroLeague Finals, where they eventually lost to Real Madrid, by a score of 85–80. During the 2017–18 EuroLeague season, Sloukas averaged career-highs of 10 points, 2.5 rebounds, and 5.4 assists per game, in 35 games played.

As a member of Fenerbahçe, Sloukas also won three Turkish Super League championships (2016, 2017, 2018), the Turkish Cup (2016), and two Turkish President's Super Cups (2016, 2017). On 25 April 2019, Sloukas, was the star yet again for the Turkish side as he finished the game with a double-double of 25 points, 10 assists, 5 rebounds, and 4 steals against BC Žalgiris helping his club to win the series with an aggregate 3-1 to secure a place in the FInal-4 for a fifth consecutive season. Sloukas has qualified for seven Final-4's in his career, with all seven appearances coming in the last eight seasons. On July 23, 2020 Sloukas and the Turkish club officially parted ways after five successful seasons.

Return to Olympiacos
On July 24, 2020, Sloukas signed a three-year contract with Olympiacos.

On 12 August 2020, it was announced by the Euroleague that it was a member of the top ten (team) of Olympiacos in the decade 2010-2020, being fifth in the public vote with a percentage of 79.33%. On 16 August 2020, it was announced by the Euroleague that it was a member of the top ten (team) and Fenerbahce in the decade 2010-2020, being fourth in the public vote with 84.78%. 

On 18 December 2020, he became the eighth player in Euroleague history to exceed 1,000 assists.  
In the 2020-2021 season, he finished with Olympiakos in twelfth place.
In the 2021-2022, he became the youngest player (31 years and 342 days old) in Euroleague history with 200+ wins.  On 27 January 2022, he completed 300 Euroleague appearances, becoming the tenth athlete to achieve this feat.  On January 29, against AEK for the Greek Championship, he set three individual career records. He had 23 points (4/6 two points, 4/7 three points, 3/4 shots) which constitute his top performance in A1. He also had 11 assists (individual record draw) and 37 points in the rating system which is also an individual record. On February 20, he won the Greek Cup, defeating Panathinaikos 81-73 in the final.
In addition Olympiacos achieved to qualify to the Play-Off Round of EuroLeague by Finising 2nd in the Regular Season. After facing Monaco in a best-of-five series, Olympiacos qualified to the Final Four with 3-2 wins , 5 years after team's last participate.

National team career

Greek junior national team
With Greece's junior national teams, Sloukas won the silver medal at the 2007 FIBA Europe Under-18 Championship, and the gold medal at the 2008 FIBA Europe Under-18 Championship, where he was also voted to the All-Tournament Team. He also won the silver medal at the 2009 FIBA Under-19 World Cup, and the gold medal at the 2009 FIBA Europe Under-20 Championship. He also won the silver medal at the 2010 FIBA Europe Under-20 Championship with Greece's junior national team.

Greek senior national team
Sloukas became a member of the senior men's Greek national basketball team in 2011. With Greece's senior men's national team, he has played at the following tournaments: the EuroBasket 2011, the EuroBasket 2013, the 2014 FIBA World Cup, the EuroBasket 2015, and the EuroBasket 2017. He also played at the 2019 FIBA World Cup qualification.

Personal life
Sloukas is nicknamed, "Slouky Luke" (pronounced Slucky Luke) or the "man who shoots and passes faster than his shadow", which is a word play on his name and the Lucky Luke character.

Career statistics

EuroLeague

|-
| style="text-align:left;"| 2009–10
| style="text-align:left;" rowspan=7| Olympiacos
| 1 || 0 || 5.4 || .000 || .000 || .500 || 1.0 || .0 || .0 || .0 || 1.0 || .0
|-
| style="text-align:left;background:#AFE6BA;"| 2011–12†
| 15 || 0 || 14.7 || .520 || .556 || .875 || 1.7 || 1.6 || .7 || .1 || 5.5 || 7.3
|-
| style="text-align:left;background:#AFE6BA;"| 2012–13†
| 30 || 0 || 14.5 || .413 || .431 || .870 || 1.6 || 1.2 || .4 || .0 || 5.2 || 5.1
|-
| style="text-align:left;"| 2013–14
| 28 || 2 || 19.4 || .431 || .377 || .816 || 1.5 || 2.9 || .5 || .2 || 6.5 || 7.0
|-
| style="text-align:left;"| 2014–15
| 29 || 0 || 18.0 || .362 || .346 || .868 || 1.9 || 3.1 || .6 || .1 || 6.7 || 8.8
|-
| style="text-align:left;| 2020–21
| 34 || 33 || 27.3 || .414 || .404 || .922 || 2.4 || 6 || .3 || .1 || 11.0 || 13.4
|-
| style="text-align:left;| 2021–22
| 37 || 1 || 24.5 || .488 || .418 || .848 || 2.6 || 5 || .8 || .1 || 11.9 || 14.8
|-
| style="text-align:left;"| 2015–16
| style="text-align:left;" rowspan=5| Fenerbahçe
| 21 || 7 || 20.0 || .449 || .345 || .860 || 1.7 || 3.0 || .3 || .0 || 6.7 || 8.1
|-
| style="text-align:left;background:#AFE6BA;"| 2016–17†
| 29 || 14 || 26.1 || .445 || .429 || .870 || 2.1 || 4.5 || .6 || .2 || 9.2 || 9.8
|-
| style="text-align:left;| 2017–18
| 35 || 10 || 24.8 || .445 || .381 || .916 || 2.5 || 5.4 || .6 || .1 || 10.0 || 12.7
|-
| style="text-align:left;| 2018–19
| 33 || 12 || 26.6 || .522 || .449 || .934 || 2.2 || 4.8 || .5 || .2 || 11.6 || 15.2
|-
| style="text-align:left;| 2019–20
| 25 || 19 || 29.3 || 482 || .422 || .938 || 2.8 || 6.1 || .5 || .9 || 11.8 || 15.5
|- class="sortbottom"
| align="center" colspan="2"| Career
| 221 || 45 || 21.0 || .445 || .406 || .883 || 1.9 || 3.5 || .5 || .1 || 8.0 || 9.6

Awards and accomplishments

Pro career
Olympiacos
 2× EuroLeague Champion: (2012, 2013)
FIBA Intercontinental Cup Champion: (2013)
 3× Greek League Champion: (2012, 2015, 2022)
 3× Greek Cup Winner: (2010, 2022, 2023)
Fenerbahçe
  EuroLeague Champion: (2017)
3× Turkish Super League Champion: (2016, 2017, 2018)
3x Turkish Cup Winner: (2016, 2019, 2020)
2× Turkish President's Cup Winner: (2016, 2017)

Individual
 Olympiacos 2010–20 Team of Decade
 All-EuroLeague First Team: (2019)
 All-EuroLeague Second Team: (2022)
EuroLeague Magic Moment of the Season: (2022)
 2× EuroLeague MVP of the Round
 2×  Eurobasket.com's EuroLeague All-European Team: (2019, 2022)
 2× All-Greek League Team : (2015, 2022)
 2× Greek League All-Star: (2013, 2022)
 2× Greek Youth All-Star Game: 3 Point Shootout winner: (2010, 2011)
3× Greek Youth All-Star Game: (2009–2011)
Greek League Best Young Player: (2011)
  Eurobasket.com's All-Greek League Player of the Year: (2015)
  Eurobasket.com's All-Greek League Player of the Finals: (2015)
 2× Eurobasket.com's Greek League All-Domestic Players Team: (2015, 2022)
Turkish League All-Star: (2017)

Records
 Holds the record for most assists in one game in Olympiacos history in the Greek League with 15 assists

Greek junior national team
2007 FIBA Europe Under-18 Championship: 
2008 Albert Schweitzer Tournament: 
2008 FIBA Europe Under-18 Championship: All-Tournament Team
2009 FIBA Under-19 World Cup: 
2009 FIBA Europe Under-20 Championship: 
2010 FIBA Europe Under-20 Championship:

References

External links

Kostas Sloukas at draftexpress.com
Kostas Sloukas at tblstat.net 
Kostas Sloukas at esake.gr 
Kostas Sloukas at baskethotel.com
Kostas Sloukas at basket.gr 
Kostas Sloukas at eurobasket.com
Kostas Sloukas at euroleague.net

1990 births
Living people
2014 FIBA Basketball World Cup players
2019 FIBA Basketball World Cup players
Aris B.C. players
Fenerbahçe men's basketball players
Greek Basket League players
Greek expatriate basketball people in Turkey
Greek men's basketball players
Olympiacos B.C. players
Point guards
Shooting guards
Basketball players from Thessaloniki